An animal engine is a machine powered by an animal. Horses, donkeys, oxen, dogs, and humans have all been used in this way. An unusual  example of an animal engine was recorded at Portland, Victoria in 1866. A kangaroo had been tamed and trained to work a treadmill which drove various items of machinery.

See also
Experiment (horse powered boat)
Gin gang
Horse mill
Horse engine
Persian well
Treadwheel
Turnspit dog

Books 
 Animal Powered Machines, J. Kenneth Major. Shire Album 128 - Shire Publications 1985.

References 

Grinding mills
Machinery